is the 15th studio album by Japanese singer/songwriter Mari Hamada, released on February 23, 2000. It was Hamada's second and final release by Polydor Records. The album was reissued alongside Hamada's past releases on January 15, 2014.

Blanche peaked at No. 35 on Oricon's albums chart.

Track listing

Charts

Personnel 
 Michael Landau – guitar
 Dean Parks – guitar
 Takashi Masuzaki – guitar
 Hiroyuki Ohtsuki – guitar, bass
 Leland Sklar – bass
 Kevin Savigor – keyboards
 Robbie Buchanan – keyboards
 Takanobu Masuda – keyboards
 Akira Onozuka – keyboards
 Luis Conte – percussion

References

External links 
  (Mari Hamada)
  (Universal Music Japan)
 
 

2000 albums
Japanese-language albums
Mari Hamada albums
Polydor Records albums